Lelchytsy (Lelchitsy) is a town in Gomel Region, Belarus, the capital of Lyelchytsy Raion.

Lelchytsy is located by the Ubort River, 251 km southwest of Gomel.

History 
The city was occupied by German troops in late August 1941. On September, 1941 and in early spring 1942, local policemen and German gendarmes murdered Jews of the town in several mass executions. Many hidden Jews were later caught and then shot. Then, the Jewish houses were also plundered. The last remaining Jews were shot in summer 1942, along with Soviet citizens, under the pretext of having links to the partisans.

Monuments
Monument to soldiers-internationalists who died in Afghanistan. Opened in July 2013.

References

Urban-type settlements in Belarus
Populated places in Gomel Region
Lyelchytsy District
Minsk Voivodeship
Mozyrsky Uyezd
Holocaust locations in Belarus